Warren Charles "Red" Perkins (February 2, 1922 – September 12, 2014) was an American professional basketball player. Perkins was selected in the fourth round of the 1949 BAA Draft by the Providence Steamrollers after a collegiate career at Tulane. He played for two seasons in the National Basketball Association, both of which were for the Tri-Cities Blackhawks. He attended Warren Easton High School.

Military service 
During World War II, Perkins served in the United States Army Air Forces and was stationed in the United States.

References

External links
Louisiana Sports Hall of Fame entry
"Warren Perkins played role in NBA's birth" article

1922 births
2014 deaths
American men's basketball players
Basketball players from New Orleans
Guards (basketball)
Forwards (basketball)
Providence Steamrollers draft picks
Track and field athletes from New Orleans
Tri-Cities Blackhawks players
Tulane Green Wave baseball players
Tulane Green Wave men's basketball coaches 
Tulane Green Wave men's basketball players
Tulane Green Wave men's track and field athletes
United States Army Air Forces personnel of World War II
Warren Easton High School alumni